Ioanella is a frazione (outlying area) of the Commune of Torricella Sicura in the Province of Teramo, Italy.

History
Some believe that the origins of the name Ioanella derive from the Latin ioaria or iuaria in reference to a small feudal holding within which a given judicial body had authority.  Several ancient documents refer to the area as Giovannel, Giovannella, Giovannello, Ioanello, Iuganello, Iuvanello, or Joanella.

In feudal times the area fell under the contado (administrative jurisdiction) of Teramo within a larger region then known as the ""Stato di Bisegno"" (State of Bisegno).   Nearby San Giovanni a Scorzone received much benefit from the numerous vassal holdings in Ioanella.

During the Middle Ages Ioanella became a Università (an ancient term corresponding to what is now today's comil corrispettivo di un attuale comune) col nome di Santa Maria di Ioanella. In 1813 Ioanella was placed under the jurisdiction of the Commune of Torricella Sicura). It was not until after WWII that the road leading to Ioanella was paved, this replacing a previously used mule trail leading from Villa Popolo and dating back several centuries or more. In 1951 Ioanella, along with 22 other similar locals, was designated a frazione of Torricella Sicura.  By 1967 the number of "frazioni" had risen to 37. Near Ioanella are even smaller clusters houses in locations known as Casanova, Villa Colle, Case Marcozze, Case Manare and Case di Pompa.

Abitanti
Ioanella has never been a large or even middle size city.  In 1804 the village had only 31 inhabitants.  Ten years later this number had increased to only 50 individuals.   In the mid and late 20th century Ioanella grew from 85 inhabitants in 1951 to a population of 146 in 1981.

Public education
In 1878 Italy passed a law (Legge Coppino) requiring free public education through the third grade.   Teachers for classes in Ioanella and Borgonovo were selected by the communal officials in the town of nearby Torricella Sicura.  A suitable location for this instruction could not be found in Ioanella and therefore these classes were established in the nearby villages of Piano Grande and Antanemuccio.   Several years later Ioanella finally had its own small classroom attended by elementary age students of mixed ages.   In 1888 the village classroom was transferred from Ioanella to Poggio Valle so that students from both of these localities, approximately equal in size, could be served together.   In 1891 the classroom was transferred back to Ioanella.  Following this move a compromise was reached in which classes would be held every two years in Ioanella and would be held in alternate years in Poggio Valle.  This rotation of classrooms lasted until 1911 when the decision was made to hold classes solely in Ioanella.  In the early 1950s an elementary school was constructed in the village center.  Additional work on this structure was carried out in the 1960s.

Churches

S. Maria Assunta

The main village church is Chiesa di Santa Maria (Church of Saint Mary).  One document from the early 14th century lists just under 100 parishioners.  
In the late 16th century the church had a congregation of approximately 500 individuals.  The church itself received recognition from the Italian Ministry of the Interior as a civil in the mid-1980s.  This beautiful church contains several 17th and 18th century works of art attributed to the Teramo artist Vincenzo Baldati.

Santa Barbara
The church of Santa Barbara is located a few hundred meters from the highest summit of Ioanella.  Surrounding the church are five houses of vassals once under the auspices of a nearby church, San Giovanni in Scorzone.  Prior to the end of the 16th century Santa Barbara was governed by its own rectorate.

The Quarry
Ioanella is well known for several quarries which are located not far from the village center.  Material from these quarries were used in the construction of several of Teramo's main buildings.  These include the Cathedral of Teramo, the Church of San Francisco and the Governor's Palace.

Gallery

References
Gabriele Di Cesare, Torricella Sicura. Lineamenti storici, Camera di Commercio di Teramo e Comune di Torricella Sicura, Litotipografia Eco Editrice (Te), 1989;
Santa Maria Assunta di Ioanella, 2007, fascicolo rilegato (depositato nella Biblioteca M. Delfico di Teramo, al catalogo ABRUZZO BA-N-III-9/20).  (In Italian)

Associated Links
Torricella Sicura
Villa Popolo
 Ioanella Village Website

Frazioni of the Province of Teramo